William Hallett Ray (May 25, 1825 – May 7, 1909) was a Canadian politician, farmer, and merchant.

Born in Clementsport, Annapolis Valley, where he worked as a farmer and a merchant, Ray was elected to the Nova Scotia House of Assembly for Annapolis County in an 1864 by-election held after James William Johnston was named to the bench. He was first elected to represent the Annapolis electoral district in the House of Commons of Canada on September 20, 1867, and remained in office until his defeat in September 1878. Ray was re-elected for one more term in the June 1882 elections. He was a member of the Anti-Confederation Party until January 1869, when he left it for the Liberal Party. In 1887, Ray was named to the Legislative Council of Nova Scotia.

He married Henrietta Ditmars in 1848. Ray also served as lieutenant-colonel in the county militia.

He died in Clementsport at the age of 83.

Election results

References

1825 births
1909 deaths
Nova Scotia pre-Confederation MLAs
Anti-Confederation Party MPs
Canadian people of British descent
Canadian people of Dutch descent
Liberal Party of Canada MPs
Members of the House of Commons of Canada from Nova Scotia
Nova Scotia Liberal Party MLCs
People from Annapolis County, Nova Scotia
Colony of Nova Scotia people